Kalinia is a genus of flowering plants belonging to the family Poaceae.

Its native range is the Southwestern USA to Mexico.

Species
Species:
 Kalinia obtusiflora (E.Fourn.) H.L.Bell & Columbus

References

Chloridoideae
Poaceae genera